Twilight is the debut and only album by American hardcore punk band The Suicide File. It was released in January 2003 on Indecision Records.

Track listing
"Twilight" – 1:31       
"The Edge of Town" – 1:24       
"Rum, Romanism and Tammany" – 1:06       
"W" – 1:24       
"Ashcroft" – 1:26       
"Laramie" – 1:32       
"Song for Katy" – 2:03       
"Down Underground" – 0:49       
"Mission Hill Party" – 1:15       
"November in Brookline" – 2:12       
"Song for Tonight" – 3:01

Credits
 Dave Weinberg – vocals
 Neeraj Kane – guitar
 Jason Correia – guitar
 John Carpenter – bass
 Jarrod Alexander – drums
 Recorded Jul – Sep, 2002 at The Atomic Recording Company, Brooklyn, New York, US
 Produced by Dean Baltulonis and The Suicide File

External links
 Indecision Records album page
 [ Allmusic Guide album entry]

2003 albums
The Suicide File albums
Indecision Records albums